Dimitrios Souliotis (born 23 July 1995) is a Greek professional footballer who plays as a centre-back for Super League 2 club Almopos Aridea.

Career
He was born on July 23, 1995, in Larissa. He began his career in 2012, from the youth team of Filoktitis Melivia, and in 2013 he signed for Gamma Ethniki club Tyrnavos 2005. He competed in the second division in 18 league games. On 4 August 2015, he signed a 4-year contract with AEL.

References

External links
athleticlarissa.gr
scorernews.gr

1995 births
Living people
Greek footballers
Football League (Greece) players
Super League Greece players
Super League Greece 2 players
Tyrnavos 2005 F.C. players
Athlitiki Enosi Larissa F.C. players
Veria F.C. players
Apollon Larissa F.C. players
Trikala F.C. players
Almopos Aridea F.C. players
Association football central defenders
Footballers from Larissa